Danny Jackson (born 20 October 1979) is an English central defender/sweeper who last played for the Seattle Sounders, and served as captain from 2004–2008.

Youth
In England, Jackson began playing football through the Leeds United Youth Program. After 10 years in the program, Jackson headed to the United States to play college soccer at the University of North Carolina where he received numerous honors. As a Tarheel, he was nominated for the All-South Team from 1998–2001, he was All-ACC and All-American in 2000 and 2001. Jackson was the team captain for three years including the 2001 season when the Tar Heels won the NCAA Division I National Championship over Indiana University and was named Soccer America MVP, National Championship MVP and was voted to the Final Four All Tournament Team. At UNC he was also the 2001 Patterson Medal Recipient as the outstanding student athlete at UNC.

Professional
After a successful college career, Jackson joined the Colorado Rapids of MLS for the 2002 season, and he appeared in one league match. On 17 March 2003, the Rapids waived Jackson and he signed with the USL First Division Seattle Sounders. Jackson was voted the Sounders' Defender of the Year, as well A-League.com's Defender of the Year and was selected to the A-League First-Team.

Broadcasting

In 2023, Jackson became the play-by-play radio commentator for Seattle Sounders FC, the successor to the Sounders who play in Major League Soccer.

Honors

Seattle Sounders
USL First Division Championship (1): 2007
USL First Division Commissioner's Cup (1): 2007

References

1979 births
Living people
English footballers
North Carolina Tar Heels men's soccer players
Seattle Sounders (1994–2008) players
Colorado Rapids players
Major League Soccer players
A-League (1995–2004) players
USL First Division players
English expatriate footballers
Expatriate soccer players in the United States
Colorado Rapids draft picks
Association football defenders
All-American men's college soccer players
English expatriate sportspeople in the United States